WQPT-TV, virtual channel 24 (UHF digital channel 23), is a Public Broadcasting Service (PBS) member television station licensed to Moline, Illinois, United States, serving the Quad Cities area of northwestern Illinois and southeastern Iowa. The station is owned by Western Illinois University-Quad Cities. WQPT-TV's studios are located at Riverfront Hall on the WIU-QC campus in Moline, and its transmitter is located in Orion, Illinois. Master control is based at fellow PBS member WTVP in Peoria, which also has an agreement with WILL-TV in Champaign.

W27EJ-D (channel 27) in Sterling operates as a translator of WQPT-TV.

History

Establishing an educational consortium
In the 1970s, the Quad Cities was one of the few areas in the United States without a PBS station. The default PBS member for the area was Iowa Educational Television's (now Iowa Public Television) outlet for eastern Iowa, KIIN in Iowa City. However, KIIN's transmitter was located in West Branch, roughly halfway between Cedar Rapids and the Quad Cities, in order to serve both markets. Cable providers on the Illinois side of the market also piped in WTTW in Chicago or WTVP in Peoria, depending on the location.

A number of meetings were held with western Illinois civic organizations, businesses, elected public representatives, and private and public educational institutions from 1970 to 1976. The outcome of these discussions was the establishment of The West Central Illinois Educational Telecommunications Corporation, incorporated in Illinois on February 9, 1976. The corporation was composed of these Illinois educational institutions serving the region: Blackhawk Community College in Moline, Bradley University in Peoria, Western Illinois University in Macomb, and Sangamon State University in Springfield. Its mission was "to establish an educational television network, provide educational content, create local and public affairs programming to serve the residents and businesses of west-central Illinois."

George Hall was appointed as first president of the Corporation in 1978. He had previously served as general manager for North Carolina State University's educational television station. Bylaws for the corporation were approved on January 13, 1984.

The brand name Convocom was adopted in 1978 for the corporation, and offices were established in Peoria. The original vision for the Convocom television network was to encompass five broadcast transmitters linked via microwave. The master control would be located at Convocom headquarters in Peoria. WTVP would serve as the main station, with satellites in Moline, Macomb, Quincy and Jacksonville/Springfield.

WQPT on the air
WQPT began broadcast operations on November 2, 1983, owned by Black Hawk College. Although Black Hawk was a founding member of Convocom, it never joined the Convocom microwave network and master control facilities in Peoria, as originally envisioned in the 1970s design. Instead, it branded WQPT as a locally-focused PBS member for the Quad Cities.

Bob Fletcher was named as WQPT's General Manager and Rick Best was appointed as the station's business manager. Rick Best later served as WQPT's General Manager from 1997 until June 2012.

Even after WQPT's establishment and sign-on in 1983, cable television systems in the region continued to carry PBS affiliates from adjacent or overlapping television markets. The Quad Cities and northwestern Illinois cable systems carry IPTV, the Sterling/Rock Falls area cable systems carry WTTW, and the Galesburg cable system carries WTVP.

From 1992 to 2003, WQPT operated a satellite station, KQCT channel 36 in Davenport, Iowa. After upgrades to improve the WQPT coverage area in Iowa made it redundant, KQCT was sold to IPTV to improve that network's coverage along the Mississippi River and Iowa's eastern border, then shut down in 2003 and converted to IPTV transmitter KQIN.

In August 2010, WQPT launched a 24-hour broadcast schedule on both its main/traditional service (channel 24.1) and its MHz Worldview subchannel affiliation (channel 24.2). WHBF-TV launched their 24-hour schedule in autumn 2011. Iowa Public Television's KQIN is the only Quad Cities station to continue to sign-off during the overnight hours.

WQPT has grown to over 500,000 viewers of local, regional, and national educational programs though open-air signals or local cable systems. The addition of MHz Worldview, originating from Washington, D.C. in 2010, adds international educational programming and provides diverse cultural perspectives.

Digital television conversion
In 1998, the Federal Communications Commission (FCC) mandated that broadcast stations migrate from analog (NTSC) to digital (ATSC) television transmission in United States.

Since 1993, auctions of former television spectrum to the wireless (cellular) telephone and broadband service companies by the FCC generated $52 billion. That revenue was not used to mitigate the digital transition costs for the non-commercial, educational television stations. For comparison, Iowa Public Television, which operates a statewide television and telecommunications network with nine high-power digital transmitters and eight translators, spent $47,000,000 to complete the digital television conversion. That capital expenditure was financially supported by the State of Iowa, the U.S. Department of Commerce and the Corporation for Public Broadcasting. More than 1,000,000 viewers watch IPTV each week. Contributing membership to the IPTV Foundation (Friends of Iowa Public TV) consists of approximately 55,000 households.

In August 2009, WQPT-TV launched an affiliation with MHz Networks' Worldview, which broadcasts international programming, on channel 24.2. WQPT is the only public television station serving the state of Iowa to offer this service. WQPT is also the second PBS member station in the state of Illinois to offer programming from MHz Worldview; the first being WYCC in Chicago.

Ownership change
On July 1, 1995, Illinois Governor Jim Edgar signed a bill which realigned the public higher education structure in Illinois. The Board of Regents and Board of Governors were abolished. Sangamon State University was merged with the University of Illinois system, making it the University of Illinois at Springfield. Western Illinois University was expanded to a dual campus, single university structure with the creation of a new Western Illinois University-Quad Cities campus.

Deere & Company, Moline Foundation, IBM Corporation, and the Rock Island County Board provided land grants, facilities support, and resources for this new Riverfront campus in Moline. Before 1995, the Quad Cities was the largest metropolitan region in the US without a public four-year university.

In July 2008, WQPT lost financial support when the station was removed from the Black Hawk College's FY2009 fiscal budget. By May 2010, WQPT was sold to Western Illinois University-Quad Cities, with the primary objective to return WQPT to its original mission of creating more local and public affairs programming.

From 2010 to 2014, the WQPT offices were moved from Black Hawk College facilities to the Crown Center office complex in Moline. The Master control operations were initially handled by Fusion Communications in Davenport and later Westar Master Control Services in Cedar Hill, Texas.

Mary Pruess, former president and general manager of WNIT in South Bend, Indiana, was named the Director of WQPT-Quad Cities Public Television at Western Illinois University, effective April 22, 2013, by Joe Rives, Vice President of the Quad Cities and Planning at WIU. She replaced Rick Best, who retired in June 2012. Jamie Lange, who had been serving as the station's interim general manager, resumed her work as WQPT's chief development officer.

On July 1, 2014, WQPT station offices and studios were moved to Riverfront Hall on the WIU-QC campus in Moline. A day earlier (June 30) the master control for WQPT returned to Illinois when WIU-QC outsourced this function to WTVP. Ironically, this was the original Convocom master plan for WQPT in 1983. Additional capital improvements included replacing microwave links from the transmitter in Orion to the new WQPT studios and a new fiber-optic connection to WTVP in Peoria.

Cable television systems serving Macomb and McDonough County added WQPT-TV when its transmitter site was relocated to Orion and the ownership changed to Western Illinois University-Quad Cities.

Technical information

Subchannels
The station's digital signal is multiplexed:

Translator

Analog-to-digital conversion
WQPT-TV shut down its analog signal, over UHF channel 24, on May 25, 2009, when the analog transmitters failed. Repairs were estimated to cost over $20,000 and the station did not believe that it would be feasible to repair the transmitter with less than three weeks left of broadcasting in analog. The station's digital signal remained on its pre-transition UHF channel 23. Through the use of PSIP, digital television receivers display the station's virtual channel as its former UHF analog channel 24.

After the official end of the digital transition in June, WQPT transferred the "WQPT-TV" callsign from the now-defunct analog channel 24 to digital channel 23 and removed the "WQPT-DT" callsign from its digital operations. Also, at the same time, WQPT ended HDTV broadcasts on subchannel 24.2 and shifted them to the main subchannel 24.1, leaving the DT2 subchannel vacant of programs for a few months.

References

External links 
Official website

Television channels and stations established in 1983
Television stations in the Quad Cities
Television stations in Illinois
Television stations in Iowa
PBS member stations